L04 may refer to:

Holtville Airport's FAA identifier
ATC code L04 Immunosuppressants, a subgroup of the Anatomical Therapeutic Chemical Classification System

See also
L4 (disambiguation)